Coulomb's inverse-square law, or simply Coulomb's law, is an experimental law of physics that quantifies the amount of force between two stationary, electrically charged particles. The electric force between charged bodies at rest is conventionally called electrostatic force or Coulomb force. Although the law was known earlier, it was first published in 1785 by French physicist Charles-Augustin de Coulomb, hence the name. Coulomb's law was essential to the development of the theory of electromagnetism, maybe even its starting point, as it made it possible to discuss the quantity of electric charge in a meaningful way.

The law states that the magnitude of the electrostatic force of attraction or repulsion between two point charges is directly proportional to the product of the magnitudes of charges and inversely proportional to the square of the distance between them. Coulomb studied the repulsive force between bodies having electrical charges of the same sign:

Coulomb also showed that oppositely charged bodies obey an inverse-square law of attraction:

The force is along the straight line joining the two charges. If the charges have the same sign, the electrostatic force between them is repulsive; if they have different signs, the force between them is attractive.

Being an inverse-square law, the law is analogous to Isaac Newton's inverse-square law of universal gravitation, but gravitational forces are always attractive, while electrostatic forces can be attractive or repulsive. Coulomb's law can be used to derive Gauss's law, and vice versa. In the case of a single stationary point charge, the two laws are equivalent, expressing the same physical law in different ways. The law has been tested extensively, and observations have upheld the law on the scale from 10−16 m to 108 m.

History 

Ancient cultures around the Mediterranean knew that certain objects, such as rods of amber, could be rubbed with cat's fur to attract light objects like feathers and pieces of paper. Thales of Miletus made the first recorded description of static electricity around 600 BC, when he noticed that friction could render a piece of amber magnetic.

In 1600, English scientist William Gilbert made a careful study of electricity and magnetism, distinguishing the lodestone effect from static electricity produced by rubbing amber. He coined the New Latin word electricus ("of amber" or "like amber", from  [elektron], the Greek word for "amber") to refer to the property of attracting small objects after being rubbed. This association gave rise to the English words "electric" and "electricity", which made their first appearance in print in Thomas Browne's Pseudodoxia Epidemica of 1646.

Early investigators of the 18th century who suspected that the electrical force diminished with distance as the force of gravity did (i.e., as the inverse square of the distance) included Daniel Bernoulli and Alessandro Volta, both of whom measured the force between plates of a capacitor, and Franz Aepinus who supposed the inverse-square law in 1758.

Based on experiments with electrically charged spheres, Joseph Priestley of England was among the first to propose that electrical force followed an inverse-square law, similar to Newton's law of universal gravitation. However, he did not generalize or elaborate on this. In 1767, he conjectured that the force between charges varied as the inverse square of the distance.

In the early 1770s, the dependence of the force between charged bodies upon both distance and charge had already been discovered, but not published, by Henry Cavendish of England. In his notes, Cavendish wrote, "We may therefore conclude that the electric attraction and repulsion must be inversely as some power of the distance between that of the 2 +  th and that of the 2 −  th, and there is no reason to think that it differs at all from the inverse duplicate ratio".

Finally, in 1785, the French physicist Charles-Augustin de Coulomb published his first three reports of electricity and magnetism where he stated his law. This publication was essential to the development of the theory of electromagnetism. He used a torsion balance to study the repulsion and attraction forces of charged particles, and determined that the magnitude of the electric force between two point charges is directly proportional to the product of the charges and inversely proportional to the square of the distance between them.

The torsion balance consists of a bar suspended from its middle by a thin fiber. The fiber acts as a very weak torsion spring. In Coulomb's experiment, the torsion balance was an insulating rod with a metal-coated ball attached to one end, suspended by a silk thread. The ball was charged with a known charge of static electricity, and a second charged ball of the same polarity was brought near it. The two charged balls repelled one another, twisting the fiber through a certain angle, which could be read from a scale on the instrument. By knowing how much force it took to twist the fiber through a given angle, Coulomb was able to calculate the force between the balls and derive his inverse-square proportionality law.

Scalar form 
Coulomb's law can be stated as a simple mathematical expression. If  is the distance between the charges, the magnitude of the force is

If the product  is positive, the force between the two charges is repulsive; if the product is negative, the force between them is attractive.

Vector form 

Coulomb's law in vector form states that the electrostatic force  experienced by a charge,  at position , in the vicinity of another charge,  at position , in a vacuum is equal to

Here,  is used for the vector notation.

The vector form of Coulomb's law is simply the scalar definition of the law with the direction given by the unit vector,  parallel with the line from charge  to charge .

System of discrete charges 
The law of superposition allows Coulomb's law to be extended to include any number of point charges. The force acting on a point charge due to a system of point charges is simply the vector addition of the individual forces acting alone on that point charge due to each one of the charges. The resulting force vector is parallel to the electric field vector at that point, with that point charge removed.

Force  on a small charge  at position , due to a system of  discrete charges in vacuum is

Continuous charge distribution 
In this case, the principle of linear superposition is also used. For a continuous charge distribution, an integral over the region containing the charge is equivalent to an infinite summation, treating each infinitesimal element of space as a point charge . The distribution of charge is usually linear, surface or volumetric.

The force on a small test charge  at position  in vacuum is given by the integral over the distribution of charge

where it must be noted that the "continuous charge" version of Coulomb's law is never supposed to be applied to locations for which  because that location would directly overlap with the location of a charged particle (e.g. electron or proton) which is not a valid location to analyze the electric field or potential classically. Charge is always discrete in reality, and the "continuous charge" assumption is just an approximation that is not supposed to allow  to be analyzed.

Coulomb constant 

The Coulomb constant is a proportionality factor that appears in Coulomb's law as well as in other electric-related formulas. Denoted , it is also called the electric force constant or electrostatic constant hence the subscript . When the electromagnetic theory is expressed in the International System of Units, force is measured in newtons, charge in coulombs and distance in meters. The constant  is the vacuum electric permittivity (also known as electric constant).

Prior to the 2019 redefinition of the SI base units, the Coulomb constant was considered to have an exact value:

Since the 2019 redefinition, the Coulomb constant is no longer exactly defined and is subject to the measurement error in the fine structure constant. As calculated from CODATA 2018 recommended values, the Coulomb constant is

With electric charge defined as in the Gaussian and Heaviside–Lorentz systems, the corresponding constant has different, dimensionless values.

In the Gaussian system (as for the electrostatic system), the unit charge (esu or statcoulomb) is defined in such a way that the Coulomb constant disappears, as it has the value of one and becomes dimensionless:

In the Heaviside–Lorentz system, also called rationalized units, the Coulomb constant is dimensionless:

Limitations 
There are three conditions to be fulfilled for the validity of Coulomb's inverse square law:
 The charges must have a spherically symmetric distribution (e.g. be point charges, or a charged metal sphere).
 The charges must not overlap (e.g. they must be distinct point charges).
 The charges must be stationary with respect to each other.

The last of these is known as the electrostatic approximation. When movement takes place, Einstein's theory of relativity must be taken into consideration, and a result, an extra factor is introduced, which alters the force produced on the two objects. This extra part of the force is called the magnetic force, and is described by magnetic fields. For slow movement, the magnetic force is minimal and Coulomb's law can still be considered approximately correct, but when the charges are moving more quickly in relation to each other, the full electrodynamics rules (incorporating the magnetic force) must be considered.

Electric field 

An electric field is a vector field that associates to each point in space the Coulomb force experienced by a unit test charge. The strength and direction of the Coulomb force  on a charge  depends on the electric field  established by other charges that it finds itself in, such that . In the simplest case, the field is considered to be generated solely by a single source point charge. More generally, the field can be generated by a distribution of charges who contribute to the overall by the principle of superposition.

If the field is generated by a positive source point charge , the direction of the electric field points along lines directed radially outwards from it, i.e. in the direction that a positive point test charge  would move if placed in the field. For a negative point source charge, the direction is radially inwards.

The magnitude of the electric field  can be derived from Coulomb's law. By choosing one of the point charges to be the source, and the other to be the test charge, it follows from Coulomb's law that the magnitude of the electric field  created by a single source point charge Q at a certain distance from it r in vacuum is given by

A system N of charges  stationed at  produces an electric field whose magnitude and direction is, by superposition

Atomic forces 

Coulomb's law holds even within atoms, correctly describing the force between the positively charged atomic nucleus and each of the negatively charged electrons. This simple law also correctly accounts for the forces that bind atoms together to form molecules and for the forces that bind atoms and molecules together to form solids and liquids. Generally, as the distance between ions increases, the force of attraction, and binding energy, approach zero and ionic bonding is less favorable. As the magnitude of opposing charges increases, energy increases and ionic bonding is more favorable.

Relation to Gauss's law

Deriving Gauss's law from Coulomb's law 
Gauss's law can be derived from Coulomb's law and the assumption that electric field obeys the superposition principle, which says that the resulting field is the vector sum of fields generated by each particle (or the integral, if the charges are distributed in a region of space).

Note that since Coulomb's law only applies to stationary charges, there is no reason to expect Gauss's law to hold for moving charges based on this derivation alone. In fact, Gauss's law does hold for moving charges, and in this respect Gauss's law is more general than Coulomb's law.

Deriving Coulomb's law from Gauss's law 
However, Coulomb's law can be proven from Gauss's law if it is assumed, in addition, that the electric field from a point charge is spherically symmetric (this assumption, like Coulomb's law itself, is exactly true if the charge is stationary, and approximately true if the charge is in motion).

In relativity 
Coulomb's law can be used to gain insight into the form of the magnetic field generated by moving charges since by special relativity, in certain cases the magnetic field can be shown to be a transformation of forces caused by the electric field. When no acceleration is involved in a particle's history, Coulomb's law can be assumed on any test particle in its own inertial frame, supported by symmetry arguments in solving Maxwell's equation, shown above. Coulomb's law can be expanded to moving test particles to be of the same form. This assumption can be justified by obtaining the correct form of field equations, that is with respect to agreement with Maxwell's equations. Considering the charge to be invariant of observer, the electric and magnetic fields of a uniformly moving point charge can hence be derived by the Lorentz transformation of the four force on the test charge in the charge's frame of reference, given by Coulomb's law and attributing magnetic and electric fields by their definitions given by the form of Lorentz force.

This form of solutions need not obey Newton's third law as is the case in the framework of special relativity (yet without violating relativistic-energy momentum conservation). Note that the expression for electric field reduces to Coulomb's law for non-relativistic speeds of the point charge and that the magnetic field in non-relativistic limit (approximating ) can be applied to electric currents to get the Biot–Savart law. These solutions, when expressed in retarded time also correspond to the general solution of Maxwell's equations given by solutions of Liénard–Wiechert potential, due to the validity of Coulomb's law within its specific range of application. Also note that the spherical symmetry for gauss law on stationary charges is not valid for moving charges owing to the breaking of symmetry by the specification of direction of velocity in the problem. Agreement with Maxwell's equations can also be manually verified for the above two equations.

Coulomb potential

Quantum field theory 

The Coulomb potential admits continuum states (with E > 0), describing electron-proton scattering, as well as discrete bound states, representing the hydrogen atom. It can also be derived within the non-relativistic limit between two charged particles, as follows:

Under Born approximation, in non-relativistic quantum mechanics, the scattering amplitude  is:

This is to be compared to the:

where we look at the (connected) S-matrix entry for two electrons scattering off each other, treating one with "fixed" momentum as the source of the potential, and the other scattering off that potential.

Using the Feynman rules to compute the S-matrix element, we obtain in the non-relativistic limit with 

where Fourier transforming both sides, solving the integral and taking  at the end will yield

as the Coulomb potential.

However, the equivalent results of the classical Born derivations for the Coulomb problem are thought to be strictly accidental.

The Coulomb potential, and its derivation, can be seen as a special case of the Yukawa potential, which is the case where the exchanged boson – the photon – has no rest mass.

Simple experiment to verify Coulomb's law 

It is possible to verify Coulomb's law with a simple experiment. Consider two small spheres of mass  and same-sign charge , hanging from two ropes of negligible mass of length . The forces acting on each sphere are three: the weight , the rope tension  and the electric force . In the equilibrium state: 

and

Dividing by :

Let  be the distance between the charged spheres; the repulsion force between them , assuming Coulomb's law is correct, is equal to

so:

If we now discharge one of the spheres, and we put it in contact with the charged sphere, each one of them acquires a charge . In the equilibrium state, the distance between the charges will be  and the repulsion force between them will be:

We know that  and:

In practice, angles can be difficult to measure, so if the length of the ropes is sufficiently great, the angles will be small enough to make the following approximation:

Using this approximation, the relationship becomes the much simpler expression:

In this way, the verification is limited to measuring the distance between the charges and checking that the division approximates the theoretical value.

See also 

 Biot–Savart law
 Darwin Lagrangian
 Electromagnetic force
 Gauss's law
 Method of image charges
 Molecular modelling
 Newton's law of universal gravitation, which uses a similar structure, but for mass instead of charge
 Static forces and virtual-particle exchange

References

Related reading

External links 

 Coulomb's Law on Project PHYSNET
 Electricity and the Atom—a chapter from an online textbook
 A maze game for teaching Coulomb's law—a game created by the Molecular Workbench software
 Electric Charges, Polarization, Electric Force, Coulomb's Law Walter Lewin, 8.02 Electricity and Magnetism, Spring 2002: Lecture 1 (video). MIT OpenCourseWare. License: Creative Commons Attribution-Noncommercial-Share Alike.

Electromagnetism
Electrostatics
Force
Scientific laws